Robert D. Bailey Sr. (July 26, 1883 – 1963), better known as R.D. Bailey or "Judge Bailey," was a Democratic politician in West Virginia.

Bailey was a lawyer who represented timber and railroad companies before he was elected judge, then a part-time position. He presided over the trials of the coal miners involved in the Battle of Matewan, the events of which are depicted in the movie Matewan. His diaries and notes formed the basis for the movie script.

In 1944 and 1952, he ran for governor but lost the primary election on both occasions.  He died in 1963.

R.D. Bailey Lake is named for him.

His son, Robert D. Bailey Jr., served as Secretary of State of West Virginia from 1965 to 1969.

1883 births
1963 deaths
20th-century American politicians
People from Wyoming County, West Virginia
West Virginia Democrats
West Virginia lawyers